The Hindenburg-Oberrealschule or Hindenburgschule was an Oberrealschule in Königsberg, Germany.

History

The school began as the Städtische Steindammer Mittelschule, a municipal Mittelschule in the Steindamm quarter. It opened with 27 students in three classes in October 1868 and grew quickly under headmaster Carl A. Kißner. It moved to a stately building on 1. Fließstraße in 1890 and was renamed the Steindammer Realschule in 1902.

In January 1917 the growing school moved to a new building constructed on Wallring in northern Tragheim from 1914 to 1917. At the same time it was dedicated as the Hindenburg-Realschule, in honor of Paul von Hindenburg. Professor Otto Portzehl led its elevation to the Hindenburg-Oberrealschule during Easter 1918. By 1920 it was the largest school in Königsberg, with 780 students. The building now houses part of the Kaliningrad State Technical University in Kaliningrad, Russia.

Notes

References

1868 establishments in Germany
1945 disestablishments in Germany
Buildings and structures in Kaliningrad
Defunct schools in Germany
Education in Königsberg
Educational institutions established in 1868
Educational institutions disestablished in 1945